Alam Sar (also Romanized as ʿAlam Sar and Aalamsar) is a village in Otaqvar Rural District, Otaqvar District, Langarud County, Gilan Province, Iran. At the 2006 census, its population was 69, in 16 families.

References 

Populated places in Langarud County